Memorial Reformed Church, also known as Memorial United Church of Christ, is a historic church located at 201 E. Main Street in Maiden, Catawba County, North Carolina. It was built in 1887, and is a brick church with Gothic Revival and Neoclassical style design elements. In 1914, a two-stage bell tower with entrance was added to a corner of the church. Attached to the rear of the church in 1936–1937, is a Sunday School Building.

It was added to the National Register of Historic Places in 1990.

References

United Church of Christ churches in North Carolina
Churches on the National Register of Historic Places in North Carolina
Gothic Revival church buildings in North Carolina
Neoclassical architecture in North Carolina
Churches completed in 1887
19th-century United Church of Christ church buildings
Churches in Catawba County, North Carolina
National Register of Historic Places in Catawba County, North Carolina
Neoclassical church buildings in the United States